Matha Óg Ó Maoil Tuile (aka Matthew Tullie) was secretary to Rudhraighe Ó Domhnaill, 1st Earl of Tyrconnell and Hugh Ó Neill, 2nd Earl of Tyrone.

Ó Maoil Tuile is described as a learned man and a native of Connacht (2007, p. 429). He travelled to Spain with Hugh Roe Ó Donnell in 1602, receiving a pension of twenty-five crowns a month from Philip III of Spain. He was with Hugh Roe shortly before his death. Upon his return to Ireland he became secretary to Hugh Ó Neill, 2nd Earl of Tyrone. Via England, he returned to Spain in 1605.

He was instrumental in the departure of the Ulster lords - Ó Néill, Ó Domhnaill, Mag Uidir - arriving by ship at Rathmullen, county Donegal, on 4 September 1607. It was on this ship that the chiefs and their followers (a total of ninety-five people) left Ireland.

When the group reached Rouen, Ó Maoil Tuile travelled to Paris to appraise Henry IV of France of their arrival. Tadhg Ó Cianáin, a fellow-member of the group, wrote that:

In Milan he composed a list of those of the party that remained in Flanders. He spent some years between 1608 and 1610 in the Spanish navy, but in the latter year was in Madrid.

References

 Turas na dTaoiseach nUltach as Éirinn: From Ráth Maoláin to Rome - Tadhg Ó Cianáin contemporary narrative of the journey into exile of the Ulster chieftains and their followers, 1607-08 (The so-called 'Flight of the Earls'), edited by Nollaig Ó Muraíle, incorporating work by Paul Walsh and Tomás Ó Fiaich, Pontifical Irish College, Rome, 2007. . See pages 66, 67, 70, 71, 406, 429, 466, 499, 660.

People from County Galway
17th-century Irish people
Irish sailors
Irish expatriates in Spain